State Route 284 (SR 284) is a state highway in the U.S. state of California that serves as a spur route off of State Route 70 in Chilcoot in Plumas County, connecting to Frenchman Lake.

Route description
The route begins at State Route 70 at Chilcoot. It then continues north to its north end at the Frenchman Lake Dam at the Frenchman Lake Recreation Area.

SR 284 is not part of the National Highway System, a network of highways that are considered essential to the country's economy, defense, and mobility by the Federal Highway Administration.

Major intersections

See also

References

External links

Caltrans: Route 284 highway conditions
California Highways: Route 284
California @ AARoads.com - State Route 284

284
State Route 284